The 1908 Louisiana gubernatorial election was held on April 21, 1908. Like most Southern states between Reconstruction and the civil rights era, Louisiana's Republican Party had minimal electoral support because of the mass disenfranchisement of African Americans. This meant that the Democratic Party primary held on January 28 was the most important contest to determine who would be governor. This election marked the first time Louisiana used primaries to nominate party nominees. Republicans nominated Henry Newton Pharr, son of the party's 1896 nominee, John Newton Pharr. The election resulted in the election of Democrat Jared Y. Sanders Sr. as governor of Louisiana.

Results  
Democratic Party Primary, January 28General Election, April 16'''

References

1908
Louisiana
Gubernatorial
April 1908 events